Franco is a common surname in Italy, Portugal, Spain, and Sephardic Jewish communities deriving from the word "Frank", in reference to the Germanic tribe of the Franks, who invaded Gaul during the Migration Period. It is also commonly used as a given name in Italian.

Surname

Politicians
 Federico Franco, former president of Paraguay
 Francisco Franco, Spanish general, dictator and head of state, “caudillo” of the Government 
 Gustavo Franco, Brazilian central banker
 Itamar Franco, former president of Brazil
 João Franco, prime minister of Portugal
 Julio César Franco, former vice president of Paraguay
 Manuel Franco, former president of Paraguay
 Rafael Franco, former president of Paraguay

Artists
 Ani DiFranco, American musician
 Buddy DeFranco, American jazz clarinetist
 Daniel Franco, Los Angeles fashion designer
 Diana Franco, Colombian Actress
 Fulvia Franco, Italian actress, model and beauty pageant titleholder
 Giacomo Franco, Italian etcher and publisher
 Hernando Franco, Spanish composer
 James Franco, Dave Franco, and Tom Franco, American actors
 Jesús Franco and Ricardo Franco, Spanish directors and brothers
 José Franco (poet), Panamanian poet
 Larry J. Franco, American film producer
 Pippo Franco, Italian actor, comedian, television presenter and singer
 Tony DeFranco, Canadian musician

Sports
 Danny Franco (born 1973), Israeli basketball coach in the Israeli Basketball Premier League
 Eduardo Franco Raymundo (1934–1996), Spanish chess master
 Felipe Franco (born 1982), Brazilian water polo player
 Godwin Franco (born 1985), Indian footballer
 Guillermo Franco (born 1976), Mexican footballer
 Guillermo Franco (footballer, born 1983), Argentine footballer
 John Franco (born 1960), American baseball pitcher
 Julio Franco (born 1958), baseball player from the Dominican Republic
 Leryn Franco (born 1982), Paraguayan javelin thrower and model
 Maikel Franco (born 1992), Dominican baseball player
 Manuel Franco (jockey) (born 1994), Puerto Rican professional jockey
 Matt Franco (born 1969), American baseball player
 Wander Franco (born 2001), Dominican baseball player for the Tampa Bay Rays

Others
 El Franco Lee (1949–2016), American politician
 Franklin Franco (1936–2013), historian and academic from the Dominican Republic
 Julio Franco Arango (1914–1980), Colombian Roman Catholic bishop
 Marielle Franco, also known as Marielle Da Silva, (1979–2018), Brazilian activist
 Ramón Franco (1896–1938), pioneer aviator and brother of Spanish dictator Francisco Franco
Salvador Franco (died 3 January 2021), Venezuelan detainee
 Veronica Franco (1546–1591), Venetian courtesan and poet

Given name
 Franco Agamenone, Argentine tennis player
 Franco Albini, Italian architect
 Franco Alfano, Italian composer
 Franco Amatori, Italian economic historian
 Franco Assetto, Italian sculptor and painter
 Franco Baresi, Italian footballer
 Franco Battiato, Italian singer and songwriter
 Franco Bolignari (1928–2020), Italian singer
 Franco Bonera, Italian motorcycle racer
 Franco Carraro, Italian sports director
 Franco Causio, Italian footballer
 Franco Citti, Italian actor
 Franco Columbu, Italian bodybuilder
 Franco Corelli, Italian tenor
 Franco Cozzo, Australian entrepreneur
 Franco Cristaldi, Italian film producer
 Franco De Vita, Venezuelan singer
 Franco Di Santo, Argentine footballer
 Franco Evangelisti (composer) (1926–1980), Italian composer
 Franco Evangelisti (politician) (1923–1993), Italian politician
 Franco Fabrizi, Italian actor
 Franco Ferrara, Italian conductor
 Franco Foschi, Italian politician
 Franco Fraticelli, Italian film editor
 Franco Frattini, Italian politician
 Franco Gibbons, Palauan politician 
 Franco Giraldi (1931–2020), Italian film director
 Franco Giuseppucci (1947–1980), Italian mobster
 Franco Grilla, American player of gridiron football
 Franco Harris (1950–2022), American football player
 Franco Hernandez (1991–2017), Filipino dancer and television personality
 Franco Javier Iglesias, Cuban singer
 Franco Leoni, Italian opera composer
 Franco Lo Cascio (born 1946), birth name of Luca Damiano, Italian film director
 Franco Luambo (1938–1989), Congolese musician
 Franco Lucentini, Italian writer
 Franco Malerba, Italian astronaut
 Franco Marini, Italian politician
 Franco Modigliani, Italian-American economist
 Franco Modugno, Italian law professor and judge
 Franco Morales (born 1992), Chilean basketball player
 Franco Moretti, Italian scholar
 Franco Moschino, Italian fashion designer
 Franco Nero, Italian actor
 Franco Neto, Brazilian beach volleyball player
Franco Ortolani (1943–2019), Italian academic and politician
 Franco Pellizotti, Italian cyclist
 Franco Purini (born 1941), Italian architect. 
 Franco Maria Ricci, Italian art publisher
 Franco Reviglio, Italian politician
 Franco Sacchetti, Italian poet
 Franco Sar (1933–2018), Italian decathlete
 Franco Scaglione, Italian automobile designer
 Franco Selvaggi, Italian footballer
 Franco Semioli, Italian footballer
 Franco Simon (born 1974), Indian singer and music composer
 Franco Uncini, Italian motorcycle racer
 Franco Zeffirelli (1923–2019), Italian film director

See also
 Franko (name)

References

Masculine given names
Italian masculine given names
Italian-language surnames
Surnames of Italian origin